Bugacpusztaháza is a  village and municipality in Bács-Kiskun county, in the Southern Great Plain region of southern Hungary.

Geography

References

Populated places in Bács-Kiskun County